Centre-Left of Albacete (CIA) was an electoral alliance formed in the province of Albacete by the People's Socialist Party, the Albacete Democratic Alliance and the Christian Democratic Team of the Spanish State to contest the 1977 general election.

Member parties
People's Socialist Party (PSP)
Albacete Democratic Alliance (ADA)
Christian Democratic Team of the Spanish State (ECDEE)

References

Defunct political party alliances in Spain
Political parties established in 1977
Political parties disestablished in 1977
1977 establishments in Spain
1977 disestablishments in Spain